Voltage-dependent L-type calcium channel subunit beta-3 is a protein that in humans is encoded by the CACNB3 gene.

See also
 Voltage-dependent calcium channel

References

Further reading

External links 
 
 

Ion channels